Festuca callieri is a species of grass in the family Poaceae. This species is perennial and grows mainly in temperate biomes. The name was published in 1932. Festuca callieri is native to Bulgaria, Greece, Krym, Lebanon, Syria, North Caucasus, Romania, Transcaucasus, Turkey, Turkey-in-Europe, and Yugoslavia.

References 

callieri